Féraud or Feraud may refer to :
 People
 Féraud de Domene, a bishop in the Roman Catholic Diocese of Gap (1010-1040)
 Féraud de Nice ( – 1044), Bishop of Gap 1000–1044, cousin of Féraud de Domene
 Féraud (surname)
 Places
 Feraud General Merchandise Store, a building built in 1903 in Ventura, California

 other
  "Chant Funèbre à la Mémoire de Féraud", a song by Étienne Méhul